Iliya Dzhivondov (Cyrillic: Илия Дживондов; born 6 March 1978 in Plovdiv) is a retired Bulgarian athlete who competed in the 400 metres and 400 metres hurdles. He won the surprise 400 metres gold at the 2000 European Indoor Championships. He also competed in both events at the 2000 Summer Olympics, but failed to advance from the heats in either.

Competition record

Personal bests
Outdoor
200 metres – 20.94 (-0.1 m/s) (Kavala 2000)
400 metres – 45.32 (Sofia 2000)
400 metres hurdles – 49.88 (Sofia 2000)
Indoor
200 metres – 21.22 (Piraeus 2000)
400 metres – 46.35 (Piraeus 2000)

References

1978 births
Living people
Bulgarian male hurdlers
Bulgarian male sprinters
Athletes (track and field) at the 2000 Summer Olympics
Olympic athletes of Bulgaria
Sportspeople from Plovdiv
21st-century Bulgarian people
20th-century Bulgarian people